Madhav Sadashivrao Golwalkar (19 February 1906 – 5 June 1973), popularly known as Guruji was the second Sarsanghchalak ("Chief") of the Rashtriya Swayamsevak Sangh (RSS). Golwalkar is considered one of the most influential and prominent figures among Rashtriya Swayamsevak Sangh. He was the first person to put forward the concept of a cultural nation called "Hindu Rashtra" which is believed to have evolved into the concept of the "Akhand Bharat Theory", united nations for Bharatiyas. Golwalkar was one of the early Hindu nationalist thinkers in India. Golwalkar authored the book We, or Our Nationhood Defined. Bunch of Thoughts is a compilation of his speeches.

Early life
Golwalkar was born to Sadashivrao and Lakshmibai Golwalkar in a Marathi Karhade Brahmin family at Ramtek, near Nagpur in Maharashtra. His family was prosperous and supported him in his studies and activities. Sadashivrao, a former clerk in the Posts and Telegraphs Department, became a teacher in the Central Provinces and Berar and ended his career as headmaster of a high school. Golwalkar was the only surviving son of nine children. Since his father was frequently transferred around the country, he attended a number of schools. Golwalkar studied science and was apt and apolitical as a student. As an adolescent, he developed a deep interest in religion and spiritual meditation.

Golwalkar enrolled in Hislop College, a missionary-run educational institute in Nagpur. At the college, he was reportedly incensed at the "open advocacy" of Christianity and the disparagement of Hinduism; much of his concern for the defence of Hinduism is traceable to this experience. He left Hislop College for Benaras Hindu University (BHU) in Varanasi, receiving a Bachelor of Science degree in 1927, and a master's degree in biology in 1929. He was influenced by Madan Mohan Malaviya, a nationalist leader and founder of the university.

Golwalkar went to Madras to pursue a doctorate in marine biology, but could not complete it because of his father's retirement; he later taught zoology for three years at BHU. His students called him "Guruji" because of his beard, long hair and simple robe, a practice later continued in a reverential manner by his RSS followers. Golwalkar returned to Nagpur, and obtained a law degree in 1937. While lecturing at Banaras Hindu University, Bhaiyaji Dani, a student and close associate of RSS Sarsanghchalak K. B. Hedgewar, founded an RSS shakha in Varanasi.

Although Golwalkar attended meetings and was esteemed by its members, there is "no indication that Golwalkar took a keen interest" in the organisation. In 1931, Hedgewar visited Benares and was drawn to the ascetic Golwalkar. After returning to Nagpur, Hedgewar exerted greater influence on Golwalkar. According to RSS sources, Hedgewar encouraged him to pursue a law degree because it would give him the reputation required of an RSS leader. In 1934, Hedgewar made him secretary of the main Nagpur branch. After he began practising law, Hedgewar tasked him with the management of the Akola Officers' Training Camp.

In October 1936, Golwalkar abandoned his law practice and RSS work for the Sargachi Ramakrishna Mission ashram in West Bengal to renounce the world and become a sanyasi. He became a disciple of Swami Akhandananda, who was a disciple of Ramakrishna and brother monk of Swami Vivekananda.

On 13 January 1937, Golwalkar reportedly received his diksha, but left the ashram soon afterwards. He returned to Nagpur in a state of depression and indecision to seek Hedgewar's advice after his guru died in 1937, and Hedgewar convinced him that his obligation to society could best be fulfilled by working for the RSS.

RSS leadership
After Golwalkar rejoined the RSS, Hedgewar apparently began grooming him for leadership and he was placed in charge of the All-India Officers' Training Camp from 1937 to 1939. Golwalkar's abilities (managing complex details of the large camp, public speaking, reading and writing) were appreciated. In 1938, he was asked to translate G. D. Savarkar's 1934 Marathi language  (Nationalism) into Hindi and English. The resulting book, We, or Our Nationhood Defined, was published in Golwalkar's name and regarded as a systematic treatment of RSS ideology; the claim that it was an abridged translation was only made by Golwalkar in a 1963 speech. However, a comparative analysis of Marathi language  and "We, or Our Nationhood Defined" shows that the later was indeed not a translation, but only text inspired by the former. Specifically, the pro-Nazi ideas were Golwalkar's own.

In 1939, at a Gurudakshina festival, Hedgewar announced that Golwalkar would be the next general secretary (the second-most-important position in the RSS). A day before his death on 21 June 1940, he gave Golwalkar a sheet of paper asking him to be the RSS leader. On 3 July, five state-level  (directors) in Nagpur announced Hedgewar's decision.

Golwalkar's choice was said to have stunned the RSS volunteers as Hedgewar had passed over several senior activists. In retrospect, Hedgewar's grooming (including encouragement to obtain a law degree and the authorship of We, or Our Nationhood Defined), is seen as key to Golwalkar's later success. One reason advanced for his choice is that he was thought likely to maintain RSS independence, otherwise liable to be regarded as a youth front of the Hindu Mahasabha.

As RSS' leader for more than 30 years, Golwalkar made it one of the strongest religious-political organisations in India; its membership expanded from 100,000 to over one million, and it branched out into the political, social, religious, educational and labour fields through 50 front organisations. The RSS extended to foreign countries, where Hindus were recruited into organisations such as the Bharatiya Swayamsevak Sangh or the Hindu Swayamsevak Sangh. There was a subtle yet important shift in the RSS worldview. One of Golwalkar's major innovations was an anti-communist, anti-socialist ideology, with the slogan "Not socialism but Hinduism." According to D. R. Goyal, the RSS' anti-Marxist tinge made it popular with the wealthy sections of society who generously supported it.

A  was founded in Srinagar in 1944, and Golwalkar visited the city in 1946. On 18 October 1947, he reportedly met with Maharaja Hari Singh at the request of India's Home Minister Vallabhbhai Patel to persuade the Maharaja to accede to India. He was accompanied by the RSS Delhi  Vasantrao Oak and the RSS United Provinces  Narendrajit Singh. Although it is believed that the maharaja agreed to the proposal, the accession was not signed until 26 October after the invasion by Pakistan.

Reorientation
Golwalkar's religiosity and apparent disinterest in politics convinced some RSS members that the organization was no longer relevant to the nationalist struggle. It remained separate from the freedom movement, and connections with the Hindu Mahasabha were severed. The RSS membership in the Marathi-speaking districts of Bombay became disillusioned and the Bombay , K. B. Limaye, resigned. Several  defected and formed the Hindu Rashtra Dal in 1943, with an agenda of a paramilitary struggle against British rule; Nathuram Godse (Gandhi's assassin) was a leader of that group.

However, Golwalkar moved quickly to consolidate his position. Golwalkar recruited local Congress leaders to preside over RSS functions, demonstrating the organisation's independence from the Hindu Mahasabha. The RSS continued to expand during the Second World War, especially in North India and present-day Pakistan. Many new members were religious, small-scale entrepreneurs interested in consolidating their caste positions with the RSS' Hindu symbols.

Organisation policy during the war years was influenced by potential threats to Hinduism, with the RSS expected to be prepared to defend Hindu interests in the event of a possible Japanese invasion. It also expected a renewed Hindu-Muslim struggle after the war. Golwalkar did not want to give the British colonial government an excuse to ban the RSS. He complied with all governmental instructions, disbanding the RSS military department and avoiding the Quit India movement. The British acknowledged that the organisation "scrupulously kept itself within the law, and refrained from taking part in the disturbances that broke out in August, 1942". In a speech given in June 1942, Golwalkar stated that he did not "want to blame anybody else for the present degraded state of [Indian] society... [when] people start blaming others, then there is basically weakness in them. It is futile to blame the strong for the injustice done to the weak... Sangh does not want to waste its invaluable time in abusing or criticizing others".

In addition to pragmatism, Golwalkar appeared ideologically opposed to an anti-British struggle; the RSS pledged to defend India's freedom by defending religion and culture, and there was "no mention of the departure of the British".

He called the conflation of anti-Britishism with patriotism and nationalism a "reactionary view", which would have "disastrous effects upon the entire course of the freedom struggle". Golwalkar acknowledged that his attitude confused people (including many  in the RSS), leading them to distrust the Sangh.

At the peak of the freedom struggle Golwalkar had famously uttered "Hindus, don’t waste your energy fighting the British. Save your energy to fight our internal enemies that are Muslims, Christians, and Communists."

Ban and arrest
When Mahatma Gandhi was assassinated in January 1948 by Nathuram Godse, there was widespread apprehension that the RSS was involved. Golwalkar and 20,000  were arrested on 4 February, and the RSS was banned for promoting "violence" and "subversion". Godse said that he acted on his own initiative, and no official connection between the RSS and Gandhi's assassination has ever been made. However, Nathuram Godse's brother Gopal Godse—also accused in the assassination plot—said that Nathuram never left the RSS, and his statement was designed to protect the RSS and Golwalkar (who were "in deep trouble" after the assassination). Golwalkar was released on 5 August, after the six-month statutory limit expired.

The RSS ban continued, and Golwalkar tried to negotiate with Home Minister Vallabhbhai Patel about having it lifted. The mass arrests, violence against members and the ban by an independent Indian government of what was understood as a patriotic organization was a shock to the RSS membership.

Although Patel asked the RSS to join the Congress, Golwalkar disapproved. Patel then demanded, as a precondition, that the RSS adopt a written constitution. Golwalkar responded by beginning a satyagraha on 9 December 1948, and he and 60,000 RSS volunteers were arrested. RSS leaders Eknath Ranade, Bhaiyaji Dani and Balasaheb Deoras suspended the satyagraha in January 1949 and, in collaboration with liberal leader T. R. Venkatarama Sastri, wrote an RSS constitution of which Patel approved. The ban was lifted on 11 July 1949. The government of India issued a statement that the decision to lift the ban had been made in view of Golwalkar's promise of loyalty to the Constitution of India and acceptance of India's national flag explicitly in the RSS constitution. Organizations founded and supported by RSS volunteers became collectively known as Sangh Parivar.

Writings and ideology 
Golwalkar is known to have propagated Dharmic teachings. A book based on extracts of his writings, titled Guruji: Vision and Mission, includes a chapter titled "Hindu—the Son of this Motherland", which claims that 'Bhartiya' includes only those who have followed faiths rooted in pluralism, and that Indic faith followers represent this in India, since it accepts all approaches towards spirituality. In another chapter, titled "Our Identity and Nationality", he wrote that "All the elements required to develop as a great nation are present in this Hindu society in their entirety. This is why we say that in this nation of Bharat, living principles of the Hindu society are the living systems of this nation. In short, this is 'Hindu Nation'."

Some of Golwalkar's ideas differed with those from the RSS. For example, in his book We or Our Nationhood Defined, published in 1939, he compares the creation of a Hindu culture propagating the concept of acceptance of a shared Hindu heritage.

Golwalkar always believed that casteism "served a great purpose in critical times". He called Manu "the first, greatest and the wisest lawgiver of mankind".

According to Ramachandra Guha's book Makers of Modern India, Golwalkar saw Muslims, Christians and communists as the biggest threats to the creation of a Hindu state. Golwalkar has been criticized for similarities in ideas with those of the Nazis. For instance, Golwalkar's book We, or Our Nationhood Defined, published in 1939, includes the following quote:

However, Golwalkar cooperated with the British in World War II in their war against Hitler and Nazism and the Axis Powers, and was supportive of the Jews, showing admiration and sympathy for them. He was firmly supportive of the formation of Israel.

Golwalkar believed that people following Semitic faiths (Muslims and Christians) must be prevented from being Indians. They could live only at the sufferance of the majority Hindu community.The non-Hindu peoples in Hindusthan must either adopt the Hindu culture and language, must learn to respect and hold in reverence Hindu religion, must entertain no idea but those of glorification of the Hindu race and culture — in one word they must cease to be foreigners, or may stay in the country, wholly subordinated to the Hindu nation, claiming nothing, deserving no privileges, far less preferential treatment—not even citizen's rights.

Legacy
The Central Government's motion to rename the second campus of Rajiv Gandhi Centre for Biotechnology after Golwalkar led to controversy in Kerala.

Shashi Tharoor, in a series of tweets, asked whether the centre should "memorialize a bigoted Hitler-admirer who in a 1966 speech to VHP asserted the supremacy of religion over science". Communist Party of India (Marxist) opposed this move and Kerala Chief Minister Pinarayi Vijayan has sent a letter to Centre requesting it to reconsider its decision to name the second campus of Rajiv Gandhi Centre for Biotechnology (RGCB), coming up in Thiruvananthapuram, after M. S. Golwalkar.

See also 
 Indigenous Aryans
 Vinayak Damodar Savarkar

References

Citations

Sources

External links

golwalkarguruji.org

1906 births
1973 deaths
People from Nagpur district
Marathi people
Sarsanghchalaks
Hindu revivalist writers
Rashtriya Swayamsevak Sangh pracharaks
Indigenous Aryanists
Banaras Hindu University alumni